End Child Poverty coalition was set up in 2001 by a group of UK children's charities, social justice groups, faith-groups, trade unions and others concerned about what they considered the unacceptably high levels of child poverty in the UK.

It was established as a charity in 2003 with a single goal - to eradicate child poverty in the United Kingdom. In 2010 it was removed from the Charity Commission's register, and it is now hosted by the Child Poverty Action Group.

Objects
 Inform the public about the causes and effects of child poverty
 Forge a commitment between and across the public, private and voluntary sectors to end child poverty by 2020
 Promote the case for ending child poverty by 2020 with this and every future Government.

Activities
The coalition involves children, young people and parents with experience of poverty and others in a wide range of activities, such as a children's poetry anthology, a children Queen's speech and in lobbying the Chancellor and Government Ministers. The coalition has also organised cross-sector events such as the National Poverty Hearing, held on Wednesday 6 December 2006 working with Church Action on Poverty, Age Concern, Help the Aged, Joseph Rowntree Foundation, Oxfam, Poverty Alliance, Refugee Council, Shelter and the UK Coalition Against Poverty. The event engaged senior politicians, policy makers and opinion formers in the media and public life and grassroots anti-poverty/civil society groups from across the United Kingdom.

From the International Day for the Eradication of Poverty on October 17 until Universal Children's Day on November 20 End Child Poverty led a Month of Action to call attention to the millions of children in poverty and demand action; calling on the Government to place child poverty firmly at the centre of their agenda and asking the chancellor to ‘play ball!’ to deliver, in the Comprehensive Spending Review, the resources needed to end child poverty, once and for all.

Funding members
Major funding members include: Barnardo's, The Children's Society, Action for Children, NSPCC, and Save the Children. Other members include The Church of England, Caritas, the Citizens Advice Bureau, Coram, the Family Holiday Association, Liberal Judaism, Mencap, the National Union of Students, the National Youth Agency, the National Council for Voluntary Youth Services, Oxfam UK, Rathbone, Scope and Shelter.

News coverage
http://news.bbc.co.uk/1/hi/business/3478443.stm

https://www.theguardian.com/uk_news/story/0,,1924378,00.html

https://web.archive.org/web/20061023031427/http://news.independent.co.uk/uk/politics/article1886643.ece

https://web.archive.org/web/20070205120732/http://www.hm-treasury.gov.uk/Newsroom_and_Speeches/Press/2001/press_50_01.cfm

References

External links

Charities based in London
Children's charities based in the United Kingdom
Child poverty